Kevin Terrel Fitzgerald (born September 23, 1951), a board certified veterinarian who works at Alameda East Veterinary Hospital in his native Denver, Colorado is best known through his visibility on the Animal Planet reality show Emergency Vets and, more recently, E-Vet Interns. Fitzgerald also does stand-up comedy and a little tap dancing. In 2001, he was named one of the 50 most eligible bachelors by People.

Past jobs and positions
Kevin Fitzgerald was formerly a teacher at the University of Hawaii. On summers off, he was hired by Tony Funches and Barry Fey to be a part of the (Denver based) Feyline Security Team and worked security for a wide variety of musical acts, such as Elvis Presley, The Who, Bob Marley, Willie Nelson, George Clinton, and The Rolling Stones. Kevin eventually ran this portion of Barry Fey's Concert Promotion & Production Business after Tony Funches moved on to other pursuits. On an episode of Emergency Vets, Fitzgerald noted that he knew it was time to get serious about pursuing a career in veterinary medicine when Keith Richards of the Rolling Stones asked him point-blank if he wanted to "still be a bouncer at 50".

Fitzgerald joined the staff of Alameda East, a 24-hour facility equipped to provide emergency care, in 1985. He also once served as president of the Denver Area Veterinary Medical Society while he was on the board of directors of the Rocky Mountain Poison and Drug Center.

Current jobs and positions
Fitzgerald is a veterinarian at Alameda East Veterinary Hospital, where the Animal Planet television series Emergency Vets and its follow-up E-Vet Interns were filmed. For the past 25 years, he has been an assistant professor adjunct at the University of Denver, where he teaches a course called "Perspectives in Veterinary Medicine". He also serves as a veterinary consultant for the Aurora, Colorado police department's K-9 division.  He has written chapters in medical texts on subjects such as emergency veterinarian medicine, toxicology, and reptile medicine and surgery.

Fitzgerald is also a regular on the Denver-area stand-up comedy circuit, where he is billed as "the hardest working veterinarian in show business". An episode of Emergency Vets entitled "Fitz's Day" showed snippets of his stand-up act. "Everybody laughed when I said I wanted to do comedy", Fitzgerald noted dryly, "but no one's laughing now."

On August 11, 2007, Fitzgerald was a "Not My Job" guest on NPR's "Wait Wait ... Don't Tell Me".  He told stories about Keith Richards ("when Keith Richards suggests you're wasting your life, you gotta listen"), his fear of spiders and then correctly answered all three questions regarding BALCO founder Victor Conte.  The segment has been replayed on several of Wait Wait ... Don't Tell Me's "best of" and compilation episodes; as of February 2017, this is the most-repeated guest segment of the show.

After Emergency Vets ceased production in 2002, Fitzgerald occasionally appeared in a set of pet health reminder PSAs on Animal Planet called "Animal Tips With Dr. Fitz". He also appeared in PSAs for the Animal Planet animal welfare project "ROAR" (Reach Out, Act, Respond) with his Alameda East colleague, Dr. Holly Knor.

In 2007, Fitzgerald and the rest of the Alameda East team returned to prime-time television in a new Animal Planet series, E-Vet Interns. On the new series, Fitzgerald continually stresses the importance of exposing young vets to experiences with exotic animals such as snakes and other reptiles, as well as showing young vets how to give back to their community by providing services for "working animals" such as police dogs.

Stalking
Vicki Tenney, a West Virginia woman, began stalking Fitzgerald in 1999. She began by writing fan letters and in 2002, relocated to Denver and made death threats against Fitzgerald.  By Christmas in 2004, Tenney was calling Fitzgerald daily saying she was going to kill him and had purchased a coffin for him.  At a hearing in January 2006, she was deemed unfit to stand trial and  ordered into treatment.

On October 27, 2006, Tenney was sentenced to 18 months of probation, obtain mental health treatment, and ordered to stay away from Fitzgerald and Alameda East Veterinary Hospital in a plea bargain in which she pleaded guilty to violating a restraining order. Doctors deemed Tenney more suitable to stand trial since her treatment began, but the prosecutor of the case, stating that she believed the disposition was appropriate, declined to bring Tenney to trial as long as Tenney continues to follow the requirements of her probation.

References

External links
 Alameda East bio
 Animal Planet bio
 Have You Met...Dr. Kevin Fitzgerald?

Living people
People from Denver
American veterinarians
Male veterinarians
1951 births
University of Hawaiʻi faculty